The 2011–12 Toledo Rockets men's basketball team represented the University of Toledo during the 2011–12 NCAA Division I men's basketball season. The Rockets, led by second year head coach Tod Kowalczyk, played their home games at Savage Arena and are members of the West Division of the Mid-American Conference. They finished the season 19–17, 7–9 in MAC play to finish in second place in the West Division. They lost in the quarterfinals of the MAC Basketball tournament to Ohio. They were invited to the 2012 CollegeInsider.com Tournament where they defeated McNeese State in the first round before falling to Robert Morris in the second round.

Roster

Schedule

|-
!colspan=9 style=| Exhibition

|-
!colspan=9 style=| Regular season

|-
!colspan=9 style=| MAC tournament

|-
!colspan=9 style=| CollegeInsider.com tournament

References

Toledo Rockets men's basketball seasons
Toledo
Toledo